The following are characters who first appeared, or returned, in the BBC soap opera EastEnders during 2010 listed by order of first appearance. Executive producer Diederick Santer left EastEnders on 26 February 2010, handing over to Bryan Kirkwood, who fully took control from 1 March 2010.

Santer introduced five new main characters in January, three from the online spin-off EastEnders: E20, Zsa Zsa Carter (Emer Kenny), Leon Small (Sam Attwater) and Fatboy (Ricky Norwood), as well as two members of the long-established Mitchell family, Glenda Mitchell, played by Glynis Barber, and her son Danny (Liam Bergin). February saw the show's first birth of 2010, with Kamil Masood, the fourth child of the established Zainab Masood (Nina Wadia) and Masood Ahmed (Nitin Ganatra). The same month, Sandy Gibson (Caroline Pegg/Martha Cope), the mother of Dotty Cotton (Molly Conlin/Milly Zero) appeared. The character of Harvey Freeman, played by Martin Jarvis, was introduced in April, and the fourth main character from EastEnders: E20, Mercy Olubunmi (Bunmi Mojekwu), joined EastEnders in May. Kirkwood's first major casting was Zöe Lucker in the role of Vanessa Gold and later cast her daughter Jodie (Kylie Babbington) and husband Harry (Linal Haft), as well as Mercy's grandmother Grace (Ellen Thomas), all of whom appeared in June. June also saw the show's second birth of the year, that of Lily Branning, the daughter of Stacey Branning (Lacey Turner) and Ryan Malloy (Neil McDermott). In September, Richard Mitchell became the third birth of the year, born to Sam Mitchell (Danniella Westbrook/Kim Medcalf) and Jack Branning (Scott Maslen). Three characters arrived in October: Greg Jessop (Stefan Booth), Tanya Branning's (Jo Joyner) fiancé; Michael Moon (Steve John Shepherd), Alfie Moon's (Shane Richie) cousin; and Julie Perkins (Cathy Murphy), an old friend of Billy Mitchell (Perry Fenwick). In November, Kirkwood introduced Zainab's ex-husband, Yusef Khan (Ace Bhatti). Two more babies were born in December, James Branning and Tommy Moon, which triggered a long-running storyline for Ronnie Branning (Samantha Womack) and Kat Moon (Jessie Wallace).

Fatima Inzamam

Fatima Inzamam is the wife of Inzamam Ahmed (Paul Bhattacharjee) and mother of Jamila (Sara Aisha Kent) and Ali (Omar Kent). She made her first screen appearance on 1 January 2010 played by an uncredited actress. Anu Hasan took over the role for Fatima's return from 15 May 2015.

She first appears before Syed Masood's (Marc Elliott) wedding to Amira Shah (Preeya Kalidas) but leaves when Inzamam's brother Masood Ahmed (Nitin Ganatra) tells Inzamam he is no longer welcome at the wedding. In May 2015, Fatima visits after being contacted by her niece Shabnam Masood (Rakhee Thakrar) to find her a husband for an arranged marriage, frustrated at her boyfriend Kush Kazemi's (Davood Ghadami) inability to commit. Fatima invites the suitor, Asim (Nitin Kundra), to the house and introduces him to Shabnam. However, when Shabnam dodges the question of future children, Fatima confronts her, revealing she knows Shabnam abandoned her daughter on her doorstep seven years earlier. She tells Shabnam that she does not keep in touch with the child's adoptive parents but assures her that she is in good health. After Shabnam accepts Kush's proposal, Fatima confesses to Masood that she and Inzamam have separated, he has moved back to Pakistan and that she lied to Shabnam about her daughter; she knows where she is. Fatima later visits again with Shabnam's wedding dress and makes alterations to it to conceal her pregnancy bump.

Fatima is shocked when Shabnam brings up Denise Fox (Diane Parish) and Stacey Slater's (Lacey Turner) past relationships, discovering that Denise's ex-husband, Lucas Johnson (Don Gilet), is a serial killer and that Stacey had an affair with her father-in-law, Max Branning (Jake Wood). Fatima is also shocked to discover Shabnam had been in numerous relationships previously and is unimpressed when Denise, Stacey and Kush's mother Carmel (Bonnie Langford) drink alcohol, worrying about the effect it will have on Masood's reputation. When Carmel questions her relationship with Masood, Fatima is forced to reveal that she is just his sister-in-law, stopping short of revealing that her marriage is over. Once she has finished with Shabnam's dress, Carmel disapproves of the alterations and tells an unimpressed Fatima that Shabnam should not be ashamed to be pregnant, which Shabnam agrees with. Masood later calls Fatima back to the house and she tells him that she felt that she had married the wrong brother. Shabnam then walks in on them kissing and leaves in shock. Fatima is then outraged to discover that Masood had slept with Carmel, and leaves angrily, telling her nephew, Masood's son Tamwar (Himesh Patel), that Masood is just as bad as Inzamam. She returns on the eve of Shabnam and Kush's wedding and helps Shabnam, Carmel, Stacey and Denise with the wedding preparations. She is also present at the wedding ceremony the next day where she meets her new nephew, Masood's youngest son Kamil (Arian Chikhlia), whose mother Zainab Masood (Nina Wadia) has flown out from Pakistan for the occasion.

Laura-Jane Tyler from Inside Soap praised the character, saying "how sweet is Shabnam's Auntie Fatima? Supportive, understanding, calm and reasoned, she's the loving mother the Masood kids never had!"

Zsa Zsa Carter

Zsa Zsa Carter is played by Emer Kenny and made her first appearance on 5 January 2010 before appearing in the Internet spin-off EastEnders: E20. She is one of four characters created for the spin-off who also appear in the main show. Kenny's casting was announced on 25 November 2009. She was cast while writing the second episode of E20. Zsa Zsa is the niece of regular character Shirley Carter (Linda Henry), with whom she is said to have a lot in common. She is described as "Beautiful, funky and an outspoken tomboy," as well as "a lone wolf [who] doesn't care about anyone." Zsa Zsa was axed in May 2010 by new executive producer Bryan Kirkwood, though Kenny continued to write for EastEnders: E20. Her storylines mostly revolve around her relationship with Leon Small (Sam Attwater). The character's last appearance was on 30 September 2010.

Leon Small

Leon Small is played by Sam Attwater and makes his first appearance on 5 January 2010 before appearing in the Internet spin-off EastEnders: E20. He is one of four characters created for the spin-off who also appear in the main show. Attwater's casting was announced on 25 November 2009. Leon is described as "Sexy and effortlessly cool [with] a short fuse and a lack of respect for those in authority." His mother died when he was a child and he was left in charge of his alcoholic father. He also practices boxing. He was axed in May 2010 by new executive producer Bryan Kirkwood. His storylines revolve around his relationships with Zsa Zsa Carter (Emer Kenny) and Lucy Beale (Melissa Suffield). The character's last appearance was on 30 September 2010.

Fatboy

Arthur "Fatboy" Chubb is played by Ricky Norwood and made his first appearance on 5 January 2010 before appearing in the Internet spin-off EastEnders: E20. He is one of four characters created for the spin-off who also appear in the main show. Norwood's casting was announced on 25 November 2009. Fatboy is described as having "invented all manner of personas since he was seven years old—in an attempt to avoid being his real self. His current and most sustained self-creation is brash wheeler-dealer Fatboy." The character left the serial on 24 December 2015.

Glenda Mitchell

Glenda Mitchell is played by Glynis Barber and first appears on 7 January 2010. Jill Gascoine was originally cast as Glenda, but she withdrew during her first day on set and the part was quickly recast to Barber. Glenda has been described as "complex", "vulnerable", "demure, dynamic and assured". She is the former wife of Archie Mitchell (Larry Lamb), and mother to Ronnie (Samantha Womack), Roxy (Rita Simons) and Danny Mitchell (Liam Bergin). She departed on 8 March 2011. Glenda made a brief return to EastEnders on 1 January 2016.

Danny Mitchell

Danny Mitchell is played by soap newcomer Liam Bergin and made his first appearance on 21 January 2010. He is the son of Glenda Mitchell (Glynis Barber) and half brother to Ronnie (Samantha Womack) and Roxy Mitchell (Rita Simons). His arrival and casting were announced on 26 December 2009. The character is described as a "loveable rogue" and "a charmer with an eye for the ladies, while guys instantly see him as competition in the alpha male stakes." He departed the serial on 18 June 2010 after being axed by the new executive producer Bryan Kirkwood. His storylines revolved around his attempts to steal Roxy's inheritance.

Kamil Masood

Kamil Masood, played by Arian Chikhlia, is the son of Masood Ahmed (Nitin Ganatra) and Zainab Masood (Nina Wadia) who is born on screen in the episode broadcast on 23 February 2010, which was set on 19 February 2010.

In August 2009, Zainab is forced to come to terms with the fact that she is 15 weeks pregnant in her mid-40s, and the pregnancy means that her and Masood's plans to see the world have to be cancelled. Zainab is terrified due to her age and the fact a baby will interfere with her career, and she feels trapped because she does not want the baby but abortion is forbidden by her faith.

In February 2010, Zainab becomes locked inside her office unable to contact anyone when her labour starts. She is found by Christian Clarke (John Partridge) who contacts Masood and his two sons Syed (Marc Elliott) and Tamwar (Himesh Patel). Christian calls for an ambulance, but the baby starts to come so Christian passes on instructions while Masood delivers the baby. Kamil is not breathing when he is born, so Christian instructs Masood to perform CPR, saving the infant's life. Zainab is then taken to hospital where she and Masood name their son.

Kamil's parents divorce, and Zainab marries Yusef Khan (Ace Bhatti) soon afterwards. Yusef wants to move to Pakistan and fearful that Zainab will not go with him, he kidnaps Kamil, telling Zainab that he is being kept in a safe place. Yusef later reveals that he has left him with an old friend called Laila. Masood manages to get Laila's address and goes to retrieve Kamil. Laila refuses to let Masood in as Yusef had told her Masood was dead, but Masood forces his way in and takes back his son. Yusef dies soon after and Kamil's parents reunite. When his parents separate again in February 2013, Kamil leaves Walford with his mother to live in Pakistan. Kamil returns at the end of July when Masood brings him back. During this time Kamil bonds with his uncle AJ Ahmed (Phaldut Sharma), and then later leaves again in September and goes back to Pakistan. In November 2015, Zainab sends Kamil to Walford to meet his sister Shabnam (Rakhee Thakrar) for the first time and attend her wedding. Masood later contacts Zainab and refuses her access to Kamil unless she comes back to Walford. In December, Kamil auditions for the lead part of Joseph in the Walford Nativity play, a part which Shabnam is unsure of. When Zainab decides to get remarried she sends for Kamil; Tamwar and his girlfriend Nancy Carter (Maddy Hill) accompany him on the flight to Pakistan before continuing in their travels around the world.

Sandy Gibson

Sandy Gibson, played by Caroline Pegg made her first appearance on 16 February 2010 and departed on 23 February 2010 . In August 2021, it was announced Sandy would be returning to EastEnders with Martha Cope taking over the role. On joining the serial, Cope said: "I have watched EastEnders since it began and I'm beyond excited to join such an iconic show and having a great time playing Sandy." Executive producer Jon Sen added: "Martha is a brilliant addition to our cast – we're excited to welcome her to Walford. To say Sandy has a chequered past is an understatement and it's no secret that Dotty's upbringing was marred by her parents." He said further: "Sandy's arrival catches Dotty off guard and she'll be forced to confront everything she's tried to leave behind."

Sandy is Dotty Cotton's (Molly Conlin) mother. She turns up at Dot Branning's (June Brown) house looking for her daughter, Kirsty, but Dot says she knows nobody of that name. Dot and Sandy meet up in the café and Sandy says she was an alcoholic but gave up the day Dotty's father Nick Cotton (John Altman) took her away. Dot later decides to tell Dotty about her mother, who wants to see her. After Sandy visits Dotty, Dot decides that she should live with her mother. Dotty receives an emotional send-off from Dot as she and Sandy leave the Square. In October 2010 during a conversation with Grace Olubunmi (Ellen Thomas), Dot refers to Sandy as her daughter-in-law, suggesting that Sandy is or once was married to Nick.

In October 2021, eleven years later, Sandy returns and gatecrashes a private party at Ruby Allen's (Louisa Lytton) nightclub and ordered to leave by Vinny Panesar (Shiv Jalota). Sandy refuses to and she is bounced by club security. Sonia Fowler (Natalie Cassidy) finds Sandy drunk in the street, demanding to see Dotty (now played by Milly Zero). Sandy then returns to the club and causes a commotion, much to Dotty's shock. An argument ensues, where Sandy berates Dotty and Dotty discovers needle tracks on her arms, confirming she is using again. When Dotty asks Sandy what she wants, she tells her she wants money.

Kylie

Kylie, played by Elarica Gallacher, is a friend of Billie Jackson's (Devon Anderson) from his housing estate in Balham. Kylie appears between 24 February and 1 April, along with her fellow gang members Connor Stanley (Arinze Kene) and Mitch Gannon (Theo Barklem-Biggs).

Billie returns to Balham with Whitney Dean (Shona McGarty) and Kylie tells him he belongs with his crew. The next week, Whitney goes there looking for Billie, and when she meets Kylie, she insults her and Kylie and her friends attack her, telling her to ask Billie for their gun back. They later arrive in Albert Square and apologise to Whitney, and Billie insists he has disposed of the gun. Kylie and Connor turn up at a grime night at The Queen Victoria public house where Kylie gets Whitney drunk, insults Peggy Mitchell (Barbara Windsor) and throws drink over her. Outside, Connor sprays graffiti on a bench and then Kylie and Connor run off, leaving Whitney and Billie to suffer the consequences. Kylie, Connor and Mitch return a few weeks later and take Billie for drinks where they are told to leave by Phil Mitchell (Steve McFadden). The gang decide to rob the pub using a fake gun, and they get away with the money. Billie then realises the real gun that he hid has gone missing after Kylie found it earlier. Kylie tells Billie he must choose between the gang or Whitney. Billie chooses Whitney, so Kylie takes revenge by trying to shoot him during a family party. However, Jack Branning (Scott Maslen) is the one who is shot, and Kylie is tackled by a club employee. The next day, Connor arrives looking for Billie, and reveals that Kylie has been arrested. Several months later, she is sentenced to 15 years in prison.

The storyline was criticised by Ruth Deller of lowculture.co.uk, calling it flawed and unrepresentative of the real Balham, and describing Kylie as an "irritant". A writer on website Balham People expanded on this, saying that the writers had not researched Balham properly. An EastEnders spokesperson responded, saying "Although some of Billie's friends or associates are from Balham we have never implied the area had a problem with gangs". The Balham People writer feared that viewers who do not know the area would make "subconscious erroneous judgements almost by osmosis."

Connor Stanley

Connor Stanley, played by Arinze Kene, is a friend of Billie Jackson's (Devon Anderson) from his housing estate in Balham. He appears between 1 March and 2 April along with his fellow gang members Kylie (Elarica Gallacher) and Mitch Gannon (Theo Barklem-Biggs). Connor appears again from 8 October 2010 until 24 January 2011, and again on 15 March 2011.

When Whitney Dean (Shona McGarty) goes to Balham looking for Billie, Connor and the rest of the gang attack her. They later arrive in Albert Square and apologise to Whitney, and Billie insists he has disposed of the gun they wanted back. Kylie and Connor turn up at a grime night at The Queen Victoria public house where Connor steals a bottle of tequila. Outside, he sprays graffiti on a bench and then Kylie and Connor run off, leaving Whitney and Billie to suffer the consequences. Kylie, Connor and Mitch return a few weeks later and take Billie for drinks where they are told to leave by Phil Mitchell (Steve McFadden). The gang decide to rob the pub using a fake gun, and they get away with the money. Billie then realises the real gun that he hid has gone missing after Kylie found it earlier. Kylie tells Billie he must choose between the gang or Whitney. Billie chooses Whitney, so Kylie takes revenge by trying to shoot him during a family party. However, Jack Branning (Scott Maslen) is the one who is shot. The next day, Connor arrives looking for Billie, and reveals that Kylie has been arrested.

Months later, Connor arrives at Billie's birthday party with four friends who bring plenty of alcohol. The next morning, after everyone has left, Billie is found dead. The next week, Billie's mother Carol Jackson (Lindsey Coulson) visits Connor in Balham, who says he has heard that Billie died. Carol rants at him, blaming him for Billie's death, and bans him from the funeral. She tells him she hopes one day he loses a child so he will know how she feels. Connor, Mitch and the rest of the gang arrive for Billie's funeral but Carol bans all of them. As the hearse passes, they remove their hoods and masks as a mark of respect. After the funeral, Connor goes to Carol's, angry that she banned him. However, he realises she is about to attempt suicide and tells her it will not work. They both break down about Billie and comfort each other, which leads to them having sex. However, they are interrupted and Connor leaves. At Kylie's sentencing, Connor sees Carol and compliments her on her new hair, and asks if she would come back to his. However, Jack interrupts and tells Connor to watch out as he has a score to settle. As Carol walks away, Connor apologises and says he will leave her alone. Kylie is then sentenced to 15 years in prison.

When Carol receives Billie's ashes, she takes them to Connor to ask him where Billie might have wanted them scattered. Connor reveals he has nowhere to live so Carol invites him to move in with her and Glenda Mitchell (Glynis Barber). They then start a sexual relationship, and Connor starts stealing cars for Phil Mitchell (Steve McFadden). Carol kicks him out after finding cannabis in the flat. However, it is Glenda's and Carol tries to call Connor to ask him to move back in. Carol's daughter Bianca Butcher (Patsy Palmer) still does not trust Connor however, and accuses him of manipulating her mother. Carol defends Connor, but then finds out that he is in possession of stolen jewellery, and throws him out again. Connor is handling the jewellery for Phil, and returns to Walford to pay for a delivery of it. Jay Brown (Jamie Borthwick) meets him with the jewellery, but Connor under-pays him and threatens him not to tell Phil. However Jay then confronts him again and beats him up, retrieving the cash owed in the process. Connor meets up with Whitney and flirts with her. He also asks her to help him sell the stolen jewellery, which she agrees to. However, Phil's partner Shirley Carter (Linda Henry) buys it and Phil finds out. He tells Connor to sell it by the end of the week. Connor then gives it back to Whitney to look after but Bianca finds it and dumps it down a drain. Bianca tells Phil that Connor should pay, so Phil beats Connor, but is interrupted by Carol. She takes Connor back to her flat where Connor admits he was only with Whitney to make Carol jealous, and they start kissing. They start their relationship again in secret, and spend New Year's Eve together. Connor also starts working for Phil at his garage and starts seeing Whitney behind Carol's back. When it is revealed that Connor has been sleeping with both Carol and Whitney, Bianca attacks Connor with a metal pipe, leaving him hospitalised. Carol visits Connor in hospital but his mother Kendra (Sharon D. Clarke) arrives and tells Carol to go home and leave Connor alone, and Connor tells Carol he now has his mother and does not need her.

Carol pays Connor a visit after Whitney goes missing to see if he knows where she is. He is pleased to see her but she realises she was only with him because of her grief over Billie. He tries to make a move on her but she rejects him. The incident gives Carol closure and she is able to scatter Billie's ashes.

Reception
The original storyline was criticised by Ruth Deller of lowculture.co.uk, calling it flawed and unrepresentative of the real Balham. A writer on website Balham People expanded on this, saying that the writers had not researched Balham properly. An EastEnders spokesperson responded, saying "Although some of Billie's friends or associates are from Balham we have never implied the area had a problem with gangs". The Balham People writer feared that viewers who do not know the area would make "subconscious erroneous judgements almost by osmosis." A number of viewers complained about Connor's comment—"Do I look like that skinny white boy?"—made in 13 December 2010 episode about Peter Beale (Thomas Law), feeling that it was racist. The BBC responded, saying "[It] was simply a description—and an accurate one at that—of Peter Beale. It was not intended to be a racist insult in any way."

Kene revealed in January 2011 that his role in the soap has meant he is recognised by fans on a daily basis. In February 2011, Kene was nominated for Best Newcomer at the All About Soap Bubble Awards for his portrayal of Connor. In October 2011, Kene was nominated for two awards at the Screen Nation Awards, which celebrate the best British Black talent. He was nominated for the Favourite Male TV Star and the Emerging Talent award.

Harvey Freeman

Harvey Freeman is a freelance journalist, played by Martin Jarvis. He appears between 15 April and 3 June 2010. He is described as a mysterious  and a perfect gent who arrives to report on local elections for Walford Gazette, and is said to be a potential love interest for characters Peggy Mitchell (Barbara Windsor) and Pat Evans (Pam St Clement). Jarvis said on his casting: "I'm absolutely thrilled to be a potential thorn between two roses working with two actresses I greatly admire and have had the pleasure of working with before. I'm delighted to be reunited with Pam and Barbara and to have a part in EastEnders."

He arrives in The Queen Victoria public house to interview Peggy on the upcoming council elections in which she is running. He later interviews Pat for the same reason, but Peggy plies them with free drinks and Pat gets drunk. Peggy tells Harvey that Pat cheated on her husband with Peggy's husband, and that anything she has said about the Mitchell family is a lie. After Pat pours a drink on Peggy's head, Harvey announces that he has more candidates to interview and leaves, after wiping Peggy's face. After hearing that Pat and Peggy have both chosen to withdraw from the election, Harvey visits them individually, giving them his card and inviting them out for drinks. A week later, they both decide to call him on the same day. He takes Pat out for lunch and Peggy out for dinner without them knowing he is seeing them both. The next day he tries his best to stop them finding out but eventually they realise what he has been doing, so he quickly leaves. Pat and Peggy argue over him but eventually agree not to let him come between their friendship. They tell him so and tell him to get out in unison. Later, Harvey talks to Pat and she asks who he would have chosen if he had to choose. He says Pat as he prefers a more intelligent woman. He then waits for Peggy and she asks him the same question, to which he says he would have chosen Peggy as he prefers a woman with class. Pat and Peggy meet again and agree they did the right thing, but then both their mobile phones receive text messages at the same time and they walk away from each other smiling.

Harvey spends time with Pat while Peggy is away but when Peggy returns he invites her to the theatre. She says she cannot make it so Harvey invites Pat who agrees. Peggy later says she can come but Harvey says he has given the tickets to someone else. Peggy buys tickets of her own and Pat and Peggy both turn up at the theatre together, and Harvey's face drops when he sees them both. He explains that they are at fault for not telling each other they were seeing him. Pat and Peggy begin to argue so Harvey leaves and escapes onto a tour bus. Pat and Peggy catch him up and take over the tour guide's microphone, saying that Harvey is vermin and slapping him before they get off. Harvey returns to Walford to explain that he wants to carry on seeing them both, but if it can only be as friends then so be it. When he goes to the toilet, Pat reveals that she has slept with Harvey and Peggy reveals that she has not. They realise he is just trying to get as much sex as he can and plan to humiliate him. Pat leaves Peggy and Harvey alone and Peggy says that night she was going to sleep with Harvey and they could still do so. He goes upstairs and Peggy steals his clothes. When he comes downstairs, Pat and Peggy are waiting and they tell him to leave after Pat throws his clothes out the door. Harvey has a sheet around him but Pat snatches it off him before he leaves humiliated.

Mercy Olubunmi

Mercy Olubunmi is played by Bunmi Mojekwu. Mercy originally appears in the Internet spin-off series EastEnders: E20 as one of the main characters, alongside Zsa Zsa Carter (Emer Kenny), Leon Small (Sam Attwater) and Fatboy (Ricky Norwood), between 8 and 25 January 2010, however, she was the only character from the spin-off to not feature in EastEnders. Mojekwu's casting was announced on 25 November 2009, and It was subsequently announced on 24 January 2010 that she would feature in EastEnders due to positive reaction to the character. Executive producer Diederick Santer said that once he had seen the completed episodes of EastEnders: E20, he wanted Mercy in the main show as well. She is described as "funny, warm, sensitive and rather mysterious." She has always been a good girl but she feels abandoned when her parents move back to Nigeria, leaving her with her grandmother, Grace (Ellen Thomas). She first appears in EastEnders on 31 May. Her storylines include suffering a miscarriage after discovering she is pregnant by her local church's youth minister, Benjamin (Damien Lynch), and facing deportation back to Nigeria. She left EastEnders on 12 July 2011.

Grace Olubunmi

Grace Olubunmi is the grandmother of Mercy Olubunmi (Bunmi Mojekwu). She appears in episode 8 of the first series of EastEnders spin-off EastEnders: E20, credited only as Mrs. Olubunmi and played by Jay Byrd. New executive producer Bryan Kirkwood introduced the character to EastEnders in his first episode on 4 June 2010, this time played by Ellen Thomas. She also appeared in series 3 of E20 along with Mercy's younger sister, Faith Olubunmi, who Grace sent to Nigeria to get back on the straight and narrow, but she returns to the UK and is worse than ever.

In EastEnders: E20, Grace tells Mercy that her friend Fatboy (Ricky Norwood) is a bad influence on her. When the character arrives in EastEnders, she urges Mercy to tell Fatboy that they are moving to Lagos. She makes friends with Liz Turner (Kate Williams), mother of Owen Turner (Lee Ross) and later tells Fatboy about their plans. She hosts a lunch at the community centre and tells Lucas Johnson (Don Gilet) that she has grown fond of London but is going to Lagos for Mercy's sake. Fatboy then realises that neither Grace nor Mercy want to go and makes them realise this after Mercy has returned the key to their former home. Fatboy then says he has a plan for somewhere for them to live, and they move into a property on Albert Square. Grace attends a bible class with Mercy, held by Lucas. She apologises for Mercy's behaviour when she continues to ask about false prophets and a passage that states that anyone who questions a priest should be put to death, causing Lucas to leave. Grace makes Mercy write Lucas a letter of apology, but Mercy bins it.

Upset with the amount of litter around the streets, she urges Mercy and Fatboy to volunteer to pick it up. She takes Mercy's friends, Zsa Zsa Carter (Emer Kenny) and Leon Small (Sam Attwater), to get their GCSE results and says she used to be a teacher. The next month Leon breaks one of her commemorative plates and Fatboy tries to create a new one in the hope Grace will think it is real, but she does not fall for it. However, she praises Fatboy for his eventual honesty and displays the plate with her others. However, when she discovers Mercy has been serving drinks in Alfie Moon's (Shane Richie) illegal den, she berates her granddaughter and says Fatboy has corrupted her. Grace overhears Dot Branning (June Brown) planning to collect jumble for her church. Grace collects the jumble instead, leaving Dot upset. They quote bible passages to each other to try to show who is in the right, but Grace later admits that she is lonely and just wanted to meet new people. The next day, Mercy tries to get Grace and Dot to make up, by suggesting Grace work in the launderette. Grace puts some shirts in a broken washing machine, which annoys Dot, and after Grace gets it open Dot is still not happy. Grace later gives Dot her CV to give to her boss, and Dot says there is not a job for her but Grace tells her that Jesus disagrees.

The next day, Grace asks Dot if she has looked at her CV yet. Dot says Grace is overqualified as she used to be a teacher. Grace says she will not be teaching again as she was dismissed from her last job. Later, Dot finds a tin of cakes in the launderette with a note from Grace saying it was not about the job. Dot visits Grace and offers her a few weeks work while Dot is away. Grace feels honoured, and tells Dot she was dismissed for slapping a pupil. Dot thanks her for her honesty. However, when Dot joins a local choir that Grace is a member of, the pair start quarrelling again, as Dot is unimpressed with the singing standard of the group. She later holidays in her native Nigeria but returns in time for the wedding of Prince William and Kate Middleton. She does not watch the wedding, however, as Mercy is leaving because she faces deportation. Grace and Mercy say goodbye to each other but as Mercy's taxi drives off, Fatboy stops it and asks Mercy to marry him. Grace is opposed to the idea at first, until she realises that Fatboy loves Mercy.

After Mercy and Fatboy's wedding, Grace attends Mercy's hearing and is annoyed that they will not get a decision over whether she can stay in the country straight away. Mercy is allowed to stay in the UK but decides to leave anyway over guilt at her deception. Grace waves Mercy off as she leaves in the back of a black cab. Two days later Grace worries when Fatboy does not come home, and finds he stayed with Dot. Fatboy later tells Grace that he will be living with Dot as Grace's house holds too many memories of Mercy. Grace is surprised when Mercy's sister Faith Olubunmi (Modupe Adeyeye) arrives from Nigeria and moves in with her. Faith later holds a party at Grace's house and she has sex with Fatboy but they are caught by Grace. The next day, when Faith returns home drunk, Grace slaps her and kicks her out of the house. Following this, Grace makes appearances in EastEnders: E20, where Faith continues to ask her for a place to stay, but Grace refuses. Grace is also upset when Lola Pearce (Danielle Harold), Abi Branning (Lorna Fitzgerald) and Ben Mitchell (Joshua Pascoe) prank call her and then break her hanging basket. When Faith returns home drunk, Grace slaps her telling her to leave. Although Grace is not seen on-screen after this, she still lives locally and is mentioned on occasion. In April 2013, Max Branning (Jake Wood) informs his wife Kirsty (Kierston Wareing) that Grace has left Walford to move back to Nigeria, and that her flat is for sale. Ava Hartman (Clare Perkins) also likes the flat, and eventually buys it, before Max and Kirsty. Grace is not mentioned since.

Mercy and Grace's introduction to EastEnders made them the first Nigerian family to appear in the series. Mojekwu, who plays Mercy, was surprised at how long it took the programme to represent her community in the series, but congratulated them for doing so. On the announcement of Mojekwu's departure, it was revealed that Mercy's family would remain in the series. Bryan Kirkwood confirmed this. In October 2011, Thomas received a special mention at the Screen Nation Awards, which celebrate the best British Black talent.

Vanessa Gold

Vanessa Gold, played by Zöe Lucker, is a businesswoman who is described as "dynamic and assured" and is a love interest for Max Branning (Jake Wood). The character first appears on 4 June. She was created by Simon Ashdown. Lucker's initial contract was for seven episodes, but this was extended and Vanessa became a regular character. She is the mother of Jodie (Kylie Babbington) and wife of Harry (Linal Haft). It was announced in April 2011 that Lucker was to depart from the series and would have an "explosive" departure. Vanessa was introduced as a love-interest for local car salesman Max, intended to facilitate a reunion between Max and his former wife Tanya (Jo Joyner). Concurrent to their romance, which was extended to span Lucker's increased tenure, Vanessa separates from her controlling husband Harry, and reveals that he is not the father of her teenage daughter Jodie. Lucker describes Vanessa as a glamorous risk-taker, who does not fit into the soap's Albert Square setting. She received critical praise for her comic timing in the role, and was nominated Most Popular Newcomer at the 2010 Inside Soap Awards. She departed on 6 October 2011.

Jodie Gold

Jodie Gold, played by Kylie Babbington, is Vanessa Gold's (Zöe Lucker) daughter. The character was announced on 10 May 2010 and first appeared on screen on 7 June 2010 when she arrived in the show's setting of Albert Square in Walford looking for her mother. She is a love interest for Darren Miller (Charlie G. Hawkins) and is described as big-hearted with "an infectious smile and a personality to match." Executive producer Bryan Kirkwood told entertainment website Digital Spy, "I'm really excited about Kylie taking on the role of Jodie. She brings yet more fresh energy to the show—she's a ray of sunshine." The character is 19 years old on her arrival and Jodie is Babbington's first television role. Jodie left the series on 14 November 2011.

Jade

Jade, played by Niamh Webb, is a character which meets Lucas Johnson (Don Gilet) and appears in the episodes broadcast on 8, 9 and 15 June 2010. Jade first appears when Lucas visits a bar and sees her on her own. He offers to take her somewhere more quiet and they leave together. He takes her to a secluded spot and tells her that drinking and throwing herself at men is wrong and that her soul is lost. He says she needs to be cleansed and forces her to pray, but she attempts to fight back. She escapes but Lucas catches up to her, again telling her to beg for God's forgiveness. Lucas then removes his tie, and when he returns home, there are deep scratch marks on his neck. Jade's fate is unknown until Lucas's wife Denise (Diane Parish) suspects Lucas is cheating on her, so Lucas takes her to see where he got the scratches. They go to Jade's flat where she tells Denise that she prayed with Lucas and he baptised her, though initially she tried to resist and scratched Lucas. She says she will get help for her alcohol dependence and get her daughter back, who was taken away from her.

Jade was originally scripted as a prostitute who Lucas picks up and forces to pray for forgiveness before apparently strangling her. However, following the charging of Stephen Griffiths with the murder of three prostitutes in Bradford, the decision was made to reshoot the scenes to remove the prostitute references, less than a week before the scenes were due to air. A spokesperson for the programme said the decision was made to "ensure we do not cause distress to the families involved in these tragic events."

Harry Gold

Harry Gold, played by Linal Haft, is Vanessa Gold's (Zöe Lucker) husband and stepfather to Jodie (Kylie Babbington). The character was announced on 15 June 2010 and appears from 23 June. He was created by Simon Ashdown and was described by Kris Green from entertainment website Digital Spy as being controlling and similar to the character Archie Mitchell (Larry Lamb). He left on 9 November 2010, and returned again on 29 August 2011.

Harry first appears when Vanessa returns home from seeing Max Branning (Jake Wood). He asks her for a drink and then says he smells cigarette smoke on her. She lies that she was out with friends but he says one of her friends called earlier that day and has not seen Vanessa for weeks. Vanessa then says she went out on her own as she could not face being bored at home, and admits to smoking, which Harry dislikes. He wonders if she is seeing someone else, and after he watches Vanessa go upstairs to bed, he moves an ornament back to where it was before Vanessa moved it when she came home. He comes to Walford several weeks later, looking for Max. He asks Liam Butcher (James Forde) and his younger half-brother, Morgan (Devon Higgs) if he knows Max. Liam tells him where he lives, and Harry gives them some money. However, he mistakes Darren Miller (Charlie G. Hawkins) for him and knees him in the groin, telling him to keep off his property, leaving Darren in immense pain as he has just returned from having a circumcision operation. He takes Vanessa to Walford and dumps her bags outside Max's house, realises who Max really is, and asks Vanessa what Max has that he does not, to which she says he can manage sex more than once a week. Harry says they are welcome to each other and leaves, taking Vanessa's car.

However, when Jodie reveals to Vanessa that Harry is heartbroken, Vanessa ends her affair with Max and moves back to Chigwell. Harry then comes to Walford with Vanessa and Jodie to meet Darren. At Vanessa's birthday party, Max's ex-wife Tanya (Jo Joyner) tells Vanessa that Max misses her and she should go back to him. Jodie sees that Harry is not very interested in celebrating Vanessa's birthday and tells her mother that she agrees with Tanya as Vanessa deserves better than Harry, so Vanessa goes back to Max again.

Harry attempts to contact Vanessa but she continues to ignore him as it is Billie Jackson's (Devon Anderson) funeral. He sends Vicky Saunders (Jessica Ellerby) to issue Vanessa with some papers but she sends her away. Harry later turns up at Vanessa's house and hands her the papers, revealing that he wants Vanessa to get nothing in their divorce. He also threatens her with Jodie, saying he can get her to take his side, saying she has always been a daddy's girl, but Vanessa reveals he is not her father. In spite, Harry spray-paints the word "slapper" on Max's door, and plasters Walford with nude photos of Vanessa. When Darren catches Harry about to spray-paint a car, he stops him and Harry tells him that he is not Jodie's father. Later, Darren begs Harry not to tells Jodie but when Jodie says Harry phoned her, Darren assumes he told her and accidentally reveals the truth.

Vanessa meets Harry and he says he will do anything to hurt Vanessa, even keeping Jodie from her despite no longer feeling anything for her. He takes Vanessa's jewellery and calls her a prostitute, saying that he will let Jodie stay with her if they have sex. Harry takes revenge by throwing a brick through Max and Vanessa's window and slashing the tyres of the cars on Max's car lot. Jodie's cat goes missing and while everyone looks for it, Harry slashes Vanessa's clothes, and when she goes to throw them away, she finds the cat dead in the bin. Max and his brother Jack (Scott Maslen) then decide to take revenge on Harry. They send Harry a text message from Vanessa's phone asking to meet, and when he turns up, they threaten him and tell him to never contact Vanessa again or next time it will be worse. After they all go their separate ways, Jack is grabbed by two men and bundled into a car. Jack is later released, but reveals to Max that Harry was behind the kidnapping.

Nine months later, Vanessa contacts Harry in need of money to pay for Jodie and Darren's wedding. Harry agrees so he can make amends with Jodie, as long as Vanessa does not attend. However, Darren overhears this and reveals it to Jodie. Darren tells Harry to leave and he does so telling Darren that he and Jodie will not make it down the aisle.

Lily Slater

Lily Slater (also Branning and Fowler) is the daughter of Stacey Slater (Lacey Turner) and Ryan Malloy (Neil McDermott). In her 2010 stint, Lily is portrayed by three child actors, Alfie Duncan, Poppy Crake and Kennady Lacy-Breckenridge. Lily's first appearance is in the episode broadcast on 23 June 2010, in which her birth is depicted. Turner left the series in late 2010 and Lily was written out of the show, making her departure on 25 December 2010. When Turner decided to return to EastEnders in 2014, producers decided to reintroduce Lily. Aine Garvey took over the role and portrayed the character until 2019. Lily was absent on-screen from August 2019 to September 2020, as part of Turner’s maternity leave. The character of Lily returned with the role having been recast to Lillia Turner, who had previously appeared in EastEnders as Bailey Baker's (Kara-Leah Fernandes) friend Alyssa in 2019. Lily started appearing on a more regular basis from this point and given a child pregnancy storyline.

Lily is conceived in September 2009 when Stacey stops taking medication for her bipolar disorder, causing her to act irrationally and sleep with numerous men, including Ryan. Around the same time, she is raped by Archie Mitchell (Larry Lamb) and after trying to tell her former husband Bradley Branning (Charlie Clements), she is sectioned under the Mental Health Act. Upon Stacey's return to Walford in December 2009, she and Bradley reconcile and she tells him that she is pregnant. He is overjoyed, thinking the baby is his until she says that she is three months pregnant, and the baby cannot be Bradley's. After admitting Archie raped her, Bradley vows to raise the baby as his own but after Bradley dies in February 2010, Archie's daughter Ronnie Mitchell (Samantha Womack) tells Stacey that Archie was sterile due to cancer treatment, making Stacey realise the baby's father must be Ryan, as he’s the only other person. However, Stacey doesn't tell Ryan, and in June 2010, she goes into labour alone but Ryan finds her and takes her to the hospital. During labour, the baby is starved of oxygen, but is born healthy and is named Lily when they come home. Stacey refuses to take Lily out of the house and panics when her mother Jean Slater (Gillian Wright) does so without her knowing. However, Bradley's father Max Branning (Jake Wood) soon convinces Stacey to take Lily outside. In September 2010, during a fire at The Queen Victoria public house (see Queen Vic Fire Week), Stacey and Lily are trapped upstairs and are rescued by Ryan, who has just married to Janine Butcher (Charlie Brooks) and shortly after, Stacey tells Ryan he is Lily's father. The next day, Ryan declines an offer to hold Lily, and walks away.

After Ryan and Janine's honeymoon, Janine discovers that Ryan is Lily's father and is angry about it. She phones social services to report Stacey for neglecting Lily but the social worker, Maria de Costa (Judy Browne), can see that Lily is fine and notes that the allegation was false. When Stacey and Janine are arrested while fighting on a night out in October 2010, Ryan looks after Lily and after Stacey and Janine are released, vows to be a part of Lily's life. Stacey has Ryan's name added to Lily's birth certificate, but Ryan lies to Janine about where he's been all afternoon and Janine does not tell him that she knows. She decides to kidnap Lily and go to France to get Stacey out of their lives. However, when Ryan finds Lily in the car, he orders Janine to stop. She does stopon a level crossing with a train approachingunable to restart the car. Ryan gets Lily out but Janine cannot open her door. Then she starts the engine just in time for the train to miss hitting her car. Ryan insists they return Lily to her mother in Walford. Stacey has already called the police but Janine tells her that she heard Lily crying upstairs and took her to look after her. Ryan backs up Janine's story. When Ryan tells Janine he’s leaving her to be with Stacey and Lily, Janine publicly announces to everyone in The Queen Vic that Stacey killed Archie. On Christmas Day 2010, Janine, knowing she has no hard evidence to get Stacey convicted, stabs herself to frame Stacey for attempted murder, causing Stacey and Lily to flee the country for Mexico, just as the police arrive. Ryan wants to come with them but Stacey rejects him, leaving him devastated.

Lily (Aine Garvey) returns in February 2014, when she answers the door to Stacey's cousin Kat Moon (Jessie Wallace), after Kat tracks them both down to a flat in London. Lily gets on well with Stacey's new boyfriend Luke Riley (Matt Willis), although he thinks that Stacey's real name is "Jenny Smith" and he doesn’t know that she’s actually on the run from the police. Kat lets slip about Stacey's true identity to Luke, who throws both Stacey and Lily out of the house. Kat and Stacey visit Janine in prison to try persuade her to drop the false allegations she made against Stacey three years ago, so she can return home to her family. After spending a week back in Albert Square, Stacey and Lily leave to spend time with Stacey's mother, Jean Slater (Gillian Wright) in Brighton. After Stacey confesses to Archie's murder and is sentenced to five years imprisonment, Lily is sent to live with Jean and her boyfriend Ollie Walters (Tony O'Callaghan). She returns to the square with Jean in August 2014, and eventually stays with Kat and her husband Alfie Moon (Shane Richie) when Jean returns to Brighton. When Stacey’s conviction is quashed on a technicality, she returns to the square early and Lily refuses to spend time with her and seems to be close with her father, Ryan's half-sister, Whitney Dean (Shona McGarty). Stacey and Lily eventually reunite. When Lily asks about Ryan, Stacey confronts Whitney about her telling Lily about Ryan without Stacey's consent. Stacey bans Whitney from seeing Lily, but later reconsiders when she realises how much Lily means to Whitney.

After Stacey allows Martin Fowler (James Bye) to move in with her and Lily in May 2015, they begin dating and Martin becomes a father figure to Lily. After Stacey is sectioned at hospital after suffering from postpartum psychosis in January 2016, following the birth of her son Arthur Fowler on Christmas Eve 2015, Whitney contacts Ryan, who arrives at The Queen Vic, where Whitney is looking after Lily, and assures a sleeping Lily that he will be there for her. The next day, Ryan is determined to be a proper father in Lily's life, however Whitney desperately tries to persuade him not to tell her. Whitney later takes Lily to the park to meet Ryan, where Lily states that Ryan is not her father, however he reveals the truth to her. He then arrives at Stacey's house and tells Martin that he is taking Lily away. After being talked down by Martin and Whitney, Ryan hands Lily back over to Martin, devastating him and he promises Lily that he will return to see her again. Lily struggles to come to terms with Stacey being in hospital, but Martin's daughter, Bex Fowler (Jasmine Armfield), helps explain things to Lily. Lily is delighted when Stacey comes home after spending time in a mother and baby unit with Arthur. Stacey and Martin marry in May 2016 and Lily takes Martin's surname. Bex moves in with Stacey and Martin and the family move into a bigger house in September 2016.

In June 2017, Lily finds out Stacey and Martin are having a baby and she lets it slip to Arthur's father Kush Kazemi (Davood Ghadami) and his mother Carmel Kazemi (Bonnie Langford). After Stacey misses Lily's dance show in September 2017, she tells Lily that Arthur may have inherited Brugada Syndrome from Kush. Stacey is annoyed with Whitney when she takes Lily and Arthur for breakfast and Lily is fed up of being ignored by an exhausted Stacey. When Lily refuses to eat her tea, Stacey physically takes Lily to go upstairs in the presence of Carmel, who refuses to leave Stacey with Lily and Arthur. In October 2017, Carmel notices bruises on Arthur's arms and Lily tells Carmel that Stacey was responsible, despite him actually injuring himself at hospital. Carmel reports it to social services, but tries to retract what she said after realising it was a mistake. Social services visit Stacey and Martin and tell them they received a report about Arthur. Lily and Arthur are placed in Carmel's care until social services have investigated. Arthur is looked over by a doctor, who has no concerns and Stacey and Martin can have Lily and Arthur back. Social worker Fiona Payne (Sandra James-Young) tells Stacey and Martin she will be conducting further home visits. Lily tells Stacey and Martin that she injured Arthur. After speaking with Lily, the social worker tells Stacey and Martin that Lily feels pushed out with Arthur and is anxious about their baby. Carmel and Kush admit Carmel called social services, enraging Stacey. When Stacey cheats on Martin with Max, Stacey leaves Walford with Lily, Arthur and her and Martin's daughter, Hope Fowler, in December 2017. Stacey returns in January 2018 and when Stacey is out, Martin accuses her of being with Max, so Stacey decides Martin should leave; he is hurt Stacey does not regard Lily and Arthur as his children, but he angrily throws her out and exposes her affair. Martin keeps Lily, Arthur and Hope inside, away from Stacey, though he and Stacey support each other briefly when Lily holds Hope by the upstairs window, asking for Stacey. Martin rejects Stacey when she says Lily, Arthur and Hope need her and he decides he will not let Stacey near Lily, Arthur and Hope. Martin decides to go for custody, although his friends advise them to resolve their problems and he sees Stacey, offering her contact, but Stacey contacts Ryan to help her and a locksmith changes the locks, devastating Martin. Lily later leaves with Stacey and Martin. However, Martin returns when Bex attempts suicide. Stacey and Martin later separate because of him being blackmailed and it is revealed that Stacey is living with another man but broke up with him.

In September 2020, Lily (now Lillia Turner) returns with Stacey and Hope after it is revealed that Stacey had been pretending to be Ruby Allen (Louisa Lytton) by buying things using her identity, as revenge for Ruby's affair with Martin in Stacey's absence. The trio soon move back in with Kat, Jean and Kat's grandmother, Mo Harris (Laila Morse). A week later, Martin marries Ruby without informing the children and the next week there is a confrontation and Lily hears Stacey mocking Ruby and even go for a night out not knowing their mother was assaulted after she got angry. In February 2021, Martin and Ruby want to take the children on holiday to initial the South Emirates. Stacey is angry that the children do not have a say and even she asks Ruby buys nail vanish to see if Stacey would go on holiday but a confrontation occurs the following day and Ruby falls down the stairs and everyone blames stacey including Martin who Ruby manipulated into believing. Jean and Lily who know she is innocent and treat differently and tries to find a way to stop her mother going to prison and prove a point but Ruby continues with the claim and Lily and her siblings are upset with their mother being locked up and Lily decides to trick Martin and Ruby into letting them stay with them for a while even though many problems occur while there including lily been caught with drugs at school and nearly getting sent to prison along with her siblings by Ruby.  She then returns to being with Stacey and Jean but has to stay with Whitney for a while.

In July 2022, Lily tracks down Kat's estranged daughter, Zoe Slater (Michelle Ryan) on social media and invites her to Kat's wedding to Phil Mitchell (Steve McFadden). Lily also notices that Zoe is in London and arranges for her to meet with Kat at Peggy's bar that evening, however, Zoe ignores her message and does not turn up. Kat tells Lily that when Zoe is ready to make amends, she will be there, likewise with her sisters, Lynne (Elaine Lordan), Belinda (Leanne Lakey/Carli Norris) and Little Mo (Kacey Ainsworth).

In January 2023, Lily, Jean and Stacey's wife Eve Unwin (Heather Peace) are all hospitalised with carbon monoxide poisoning. A doctor later informs Stacey that Lily has fallen pregnant at twelve years of age and she names Ricky Mitchell (Frankie Day) as the father following a one-night stand. Lily announces to Stacey and Martin that she has decided to terminate the pregnancy as she is not ready to have a baby. However, she later changes her mind following a heart-to-heart with Kat. Lily then tells Ricky, who blurts it out to his mother Sam Mitchell (Kim Medcalf), who then informs Ricky's father Jack Branning (Scott Maslen). Ricky later tells Lily that he will support her and the baby. Upon Sam and Jack processing the news, they pay a visit to the Slaters and berate Stacey and Martin for their refusal to have Lily’s pregnancy terminated. Stacey tells them that it is Lily's choice. Sam tells Stacey that they have rights over the decision too. Jack then tries to manipulate Lily into changing her mind by scaring her about the prospects of parenthood. Lily tells Stacey, resulting in Stacey furiously banning the Brannings and Mitchells from having anything to do with Lily's baby.

Ricky Mitchell

Richard "Ricky" Mitchell is the son of Sam Mitchell (Danniella Westbrook/Kim Medcalf) and Jack Branning (Scott Maslen), born in the episode broadcast on 2 September 2010. Sam becomes pregnant after having an affair with Jack while in a relationship with Ricky Butcher (Sid Owen). The character's appearances as a baby in 2010 are uncredited. He returned in 2016 played by Henri Charles. Two years later, Ricky was recast to Frankie Day, who made his debut in the episode broadcast on 13 August 2018.

At first, Sam, (Danniella Westbrook) wants to put Richard up for adoption but her mother Peggy (Barbara Windsor) insists she keep him, saying Richard is the only way Sam can get back with Ricky Butcher (Sid Owen), who is now remarried to Bianca Jackson (Patsy Palmer). Peggy promises to help raise Richard, but she leaves Walford, leaving Sam alone. Sam insists that Ricky is Richard's father but Bianca orders a paternity test to be sure. Sam tells them the result is positive for Ricky, but Bianca double checks and discovers it is her uncle Jack Branning (Scott Maslen), and when she confronts Sam, she reveals that her cousin and Jack's fiancée, Ronnie (Samantha Womack), pressured her into lying. When Sam feels that she is struggling to cope, she asks Jack and Ronnie to take Richard. They agree and make plans for Sam to bring Richard and his belongings over to Jack and Ronnie; Sam does not arrive, so Jack and Ronnie visit her. Ronnie goes in and asks Sam to think it through, as she can see that Sam is more attached to Richard than she is willing to admit. Ronnie offers her money to leave Walford with Richard, as when Jack finds out she is keeping Richard, he will come after her. Ronnie leaves alone, but Sam leaves Richard with Jack without Ronnie’s knowledge. Later, Ronnie and Sam meet, and she gives Sam the money, telling her to take Richard back and leave. Sam takes Richard and emigrates to Portugal to live with her brother, Grant (Ross Kemp) in September 2010.

Richard, now nicknamed Ricky, (Henri Charles), returns to Walford with Sam for Peggy's funeral in June 2016 and when Jack sees him, he refuses to have anything to do with him. However, Jack later decides that he wants to get to know Ricky, who is left at Jack's house to bond with him and Jack's daughter Amy (Abbie Burke). Deciding he is better off without her, Sam secretly abandons Ricky, leaving him with Jack, and goes back to Portugal without telling anybody. Realising Sam has allowed Ricky to do what he wants, Jack attempts to get him to end his bad habits of eating sweets and constantly playing video games by giving him healthy meals, throwing his games console in the bin and encouraging him to join scouts. Ricky shuts himself in a cupboard and when he comes out, he says he dislikes being called "Richard" and then attends Scouts. On New Year's Day 2017, during Jack and Ronnie's wedding night, both Ronnie, her sister and Amy's mother Roxy Mitchell (Rita Simons) drown in a hotel swimming pool. Jack initially does not want Amy or Ricky to know, but when they start asking questions about their whereabouts, Jack says they have "gone away" and are never coming back. Ricky and Amy are left confused, so continue to question Jack and his brother Max Branning (Jake Wood) until their stepmother Dot Branning (June Brown) explains to them with sensitivity that they have died.

In April 2022, Sam (now played by Kim Medcalf) returns to Walford on business and tries to reignite her relationship with Ricky (now Frankie Day), much to the opposition of Jack and his civil partner Denise Fox (Diane Parish). Initially, Ricky is frosty towards Sam for abandoning him six years ago, but soon comes around when she takes him out of school and brings him to The Prince Albert for a meal without Jack's knowledge. Sam decides to stick around in Walford and proceeds to blackmail Jack into letting her stay with him and Denise, so she can be closer to Ricky. After many conflicts at Jack's house, Sam moves in with her older brother Phil (Steve McFadden) and his fiancée Kat Slater (Jessie Wallace). Following a public brawl with Kat and Phil's ex-wife Sharon Watts (Letitia Dean), Phil kicks Sam out and Jack offers her accommodation in one of his flats so she does not have to leave Ricky again. Whilst Jack and Denise are preoccupied with Amy when she begins self-harming, Ricky starts slipping away to "see friends".

In January 2023, he is revealed to be the father of twelve-year-old Lily Slater's (Lillia Turner) unborn baby following a one-night stand. Lily later tells him, resulting in Ricky blurting it out to Sam. Sam then tells Jack and Denise, angering Ricky. Jack and Sam accompany Ricky to the police station to answer questions about his relationship with Lily. After agreeing to start a new life in Germany with her ex-husband Ricky Butcher (Sid Owen), Sam then changes her mind and decides to remain in Walford to support her son. Ricky later tells Lily that he will support her and the baby. Sam, Jack and Denise pay a visit to the Slaters and berate Lily's mother Stacey Slater (Lacey Turner) and her stepfather Martin Fowler (James Bye) for their refusal to have Lily's pregnancy terminated. Stacey tells them that it is Lily's choice. Sam explains that they have rights over the decision too. Jack intervenes by trying to manipulate Lily into changing her mind by scaring her about the prospects of parenthood. Lily then tells Stacey, resulting in Stacey furiously banning the Brannings and Mitchells from having anything to do with Lily's baby.

Greg Jessop

Greg Jessop is the fiancé of Tanya Branning (Jo Joyner), making his first appearance on 1 October 2010. He appears to get on well with Tanya's children, Lauren (Jacqueline Jossa), Abi (Lorna Fitzgerald) and Oscar (Charlee & Neo Hall), although her ex-husband Max Branning (Jake Wood) dislikes Greg. The character left EastEnders on 12 August 2011, after Tanya's affair with Max was revealed by Max's fiancée Vanessa Gold (Zöe Lucker). He returned on 21 October 2011, however, after being informed by Lauren that Tanya has cervical cancer. He left that same episode.

Michael Moon

Michael Moon, played by Steve John Shepherd, is a distant cousin of Alfie Moon (Shane Richie), who first appears on 1 October 2010 after Alfie's return. Michael is described as a competitive and manipulative risk-taker who lives dangerously. He is a charmer with an eye for the ladies, but is willing to stab anyone in the back. He is the father of Tommy Moon, whose mother is Kat Moon (Jessie Wallace), Alfie's wife. He has a relationship with Roxy Mitchell (Rita Simons) but is disliked by Roxy's sister Ronnie (Samantha Womack), because when her son James died, she secretly swapped him with Tommy. In 2011, he is joined by his father Eddie Moon (David Essex) and brothers Anthony (Matt Lapinskas) and Tyler (Tony Discipline), and Michael's personality is further explored with their arrival. On 1 November 2013, Michael died after being stabbed by his wife Janine Butcher (Charlie Brooks), although Michael's young lover Alice Branning (Jasmyn Banks) is framed for his murder by Janine.

Julie Perkins

Julie Perkins, played by Cathy Murphy, is a woman from Billy Mitchell's (Perry Fenwick) past. She made her first appearance on 14 October 2010. When Billy is visited by police, it is revealed that Julie became pregnant by Henry Mason (Brian Hibbard), a paedophile who worked at the children's home where Julie and Billy lived during their childhood. Julie arrives in Walford the following week and surprises Billy by coming to his door. Julie says she does not want to testify against Henry, and leaves when Phil Mitchell (Steve McFadden) and Jay Brown (Jamie Borthwick) return home. She telephones Billy asking him to meet her at the café, where she reveals that even though Henry Mason raped her, they always used contraception, and the only time she did not was when she had sex with Billy. She tells Billy that he has an adult son. She explains that he was taken away from her a week after he was born, and says he probably had a better life. However, Billy gets angry, saying a child should know his parents and tells Julie she should never have come, so she leaves. However, Billy soon contacts Julie again, and she helps him sell stock on his market stall. He invites her round the next week, and Jay notes that she has made an effort to look good for Billy. They go to a party where Billy invites Julie to his relative Ronnie Mitchell's (Samantha Womack) wedding and she accepts. She later sees Stacey Branning (Lacey Turner) taking off her high heel stilettos and steals them, leaving her own shoes behind. When Billy realises Julie has gone, he phones her and she says she felt unwell.

Julie arrives for Ronnie's wedding where £20,000 goes missing. Ronnie's sister Roxy Mitchell (Rita Simons) accuses Julie of stealing it, though she did not. At the reception, Stacey sees Julie wearing her shoes and confronts her, and Roxy empties Julie's bag looking for the money, revealing Julie has filled it with food. Julie runs off and Billy catches up to her. She reveals she is wearing an electronic tag and is under curfew as she is staying in a hostel and she is trying to make her room feel like her own. Billy says this does not matter to him. Julie is accused again when she wears an expensive coat that she found, that the real thief, Shirley Carter (Linda Henry), bought. Julie spends the day helping Dot Branning (June Brown) at the laundrette and they become friends. However, Julie leaves embarrassed after Mo Harris (Laila Morse) reveals to Dot that Julie is wearing the tag. She later gets a job from Kat (Jessie Wallace), cleaning at The Queen Victoria pub but she accidentally disconnects the beer pumps. Kat sacks her but Patrick Trueman (Rudolph Walker) and Billy persuade her to give Julie another chance. When Julie asks to store some things around Billy's house, he discovers some photos of a man. Thinking Julie is in a relationship, he confronts her, but she explains that they are pictures of their son, Roger Green (Daniel Brocklebank). Billy wants to see Roger, but Julie warns it is too late. However, Billy finds his address in Julie's belongings and goes to visit him. Once at the house, Billy announces that he is his father. Roger denies this, and Julie turns up and pulls Billy away. She explains that she could not trace their real son, so fantasised that Roger, her former boss, was their son instead. Billy forgives Julie, but informs her that he has contacted an adoption agency about their son. Billy and Julie then start a proper romantic relationship as a couple and after her tag is removed she moves in with him, as well as getting a job on the flower stall. She befriends Heather Trott (Cheryl Fergison) after Heather catches her stealing and then writing a birthday card to her son, forcing her to reveal that she gave him up for adoption.

Julie asks Kat to come with her to the park as she is meeting Billy's son, Will Mitchell (Toby Warpole), for the first time and is worried that she is not ready to be a stepmother. However, as they play in the park, it goes well and Julie thanks Kat for coming. Billy discovers the name of his and Julie's son is Dan Pearce. They go to visit him but find out he died three months previously. However, they discover they have a granddaughter, Lola Pearce (Danielle Harold). Billy and Julie visit Lola in care and Billy bonds with her, but Julie feels she is trouble and not their problem when she continues to visit Billy. Lola tells Julie that she will win if Billy is forced to choose between them, so Julie calls the police to have Lola taken back into care. She later admits to Billy that she did this, however, she later allows Lola to move in with her and Billy. She is angry with Billy when he refuses to discipline Lola, and worries when a social worker allows Lola to stay though they are squatting and the social worker will want to see a tenancy agreement.

Julie takes the blame when Lola accidentally injures Jay while he is working in the Arches. The accident occurs when Lola begins working for Phil but he fires her after catching her stealing. Lola, in a fit of rage, smashes up the Arches and kicks a piece of heavy equipment down into the pit, which hits Jay and knocks him unconscious. Lola goes back to the care home when Jay gives her a day to confess the truth, and is persuaded to come back by Billy. She tells Julie that she will win if Billy is forced to choose, and Julie, realising she and Lola have no future together, leaves after saying an emotional farewell to Billy.

Development
Described as a feisty character who is an "antidote to the snarling women of Albert Square", Julie's arrival leaves Billy shocked and turns his life upside down. The character is also described as a "cockney geezer bird [who] is more at home down the pub with the boys but underneath her robust layer, there's a little girl abandoned by her mum wanting to be loved." Her profile on the EastEnders website additionally describes her as straight talking, good, tough, kind-hearted with a good sense of humour and vulnerable. She tells the truth and is not intentionally malicious, and deals with the world by putting up a barrier. She never complains, gets on well with children and young people, has a firm sense of morality and questions everything around her. Speaking about the role, Murphy said: "Like our characters, I've known Perry since I was 16 and he is a brilliant actor. We've never worked together before so I am looking forward to getting stuck into our fantastic rollercoaster of a story." Julie is Murphy's third role in the soap, having appeared in 1991 as Lorna and again as Trisha Taylor in 2005.

An EastEnders spokesperson commented on Julie's storyline: "Julie and Billy have a real connection despite being out of each other's lives since they were teenagers. She's a true Cockney sparrow and tells it like it is. However, Billy is staggered to learn he may have more skeletons in the closet waiting to be discovered." Fenwick discussed the storyline saying, "They were both 15 when Julie got pregnant, but Billy, like everyone else in the children's home, thought it was this carer who knocked him and the other kids about. But when she explains it wasn't her fault and they took the baby away from her, he shifts his anger to the authorities. They haven't told me exactly what's going to happen, but I know they're going to be really clever with this story. There'll be lots of twists and turns..."

In June 2011, it was announced that Danielle Harold had joined the cast, playing Julie and Billy's 15-year-old granddaughter Lola Pearce. It was reported that Billy and Julie would be shocked to learn of Lola's existence, not knowing the son they once gave up for adoption had a daughter, but would decide to track her down and find her living in a care home.

On 21 June 2011, it was revealed that Murphy had left EastEnders. Digital Spy reported that she had finished filming and her last scenes would air over the following weeks. Julie's exit is sparked by the arrival of her granddaughter and when Lola gets into trouble, Julie takes the blame and leaves.

Kai Jackson

Kai Jackson, played by Shay Spencer, is the son of Alan Jackson (Howard Antony) and half brother of Billie Jackson (Devon Anderson). He appears on screen on 25 and 26 October 2010. Kai appears alongside his mother, father and great grandmother Blossom Jackson (Mona Hammond) at Billie's wake. When Alan's ex-wife and Billie's mother Carol Jackson (Lindsey Coulson) sees him, she leaves as he reminds her of Billie at that age. Kai then shows the family a trick that Billie had taught him, namely axillary flatulence. They return home after the wake.

Five-year-old Spencer was cast in the role after a friend of his mother's found out EastEnders was looking to cast a boy of his age, fitting his description. Spencer's mother, Jo Dufficy, sent in a photo and said the programme's makers liked what they saw. He filmed his scenes over three days in August 2010. His father Trevor said, "This was a wonderful experience for Shay and everyone thought he did a great job, especially as this was his first acting role. He [...] was a little bit nervous at first but the cast of EastEnders were really good and made him feel welcome. At the end of filming he received a big round of applause from the cast and crew. We are really excited about seeing him on TV."

Yusef Khan

Doctor Yusef Khan, played by Ace Bhatti, is the father of Afia Khan (Meryl Fernandes) and former husband of Zainab Masood (Nina Wadia). He appears from 23 November 2010. Described as strong-willed, he arrives as Walford's new general practitioner. Bhatti has praised the cast for being so welcoming to him. Speaking to Inside Soap, he explained that he is "thrilled" to be a part of the regular EastEnders cast.

Yusef is Zainab's former husband and started a fire that Zainab was trapped in while they were married off screen. Yusef arrives in Walford and immediately makes a strong enemy in Zainab's husband Masood Ahmed (Nitin Ganatra) and continues to enrage him, leading Masood to kidnap Yusef, but Yusef gets his payback by turning Masood's family against him. He constantly tries to make amends with Zainab and is mistakenly accused of having an affair with her; Zainab's entire family abandons her when they find out Yusef stayed the night with Zainab, immediately seeing the wrong side of it. However audiences start to see that bad side to Yusef as he starts to show violence towards Zainab in the events running up to Christmas 2011.

Edward Bishop

Edward Bishop, played by Frank Barrie, is the leader of the local church choir, who appears between 3 December 2010 and 24 May 2011. The choir is attended by Grace Olubunmi (Ellen Thomas), Dot Branning (June Brown), Heather Trott (Cheryl Fergison), Kim Fox (Tameka Empson), Mercy Olubunmi (Bunmi Mojekwu) and Fatboy (Ricky Norwood). After the choir's performance on Christmas Eve, Edward collects money for the church organ and becomes friends with Dot. He asks Dot if she could help collect the money to buy a new organ and she accepts. He collects the collection money form the Launderette, leaving a note that gets lost, and plays at Tommy Moon's funeral. He later visits Dot when she applies for community meals for her husband Jim Branning (John Bardon). He upsets Dot by bringing Jim the wrong food, but then reveals that he has been asked to stop volunteering because he spends too much time playing dominoes with clients instead of just delivering food. Dot then successfully helps Edward get his job back.

When Edward takes Jim to the park and the bookmakers, she is angry, feeling it could affect Jim's health. She later forgives him and he brings her a tape of old music. When Carol Jackson (Lindsey Coulson) calls Edward Dot's "fancy man", she is annoyed and later tells Edward she does not want him there any more, other than to bring Jim his meals. When community meals are cancelled, Fatboy, Mercy and Kim bring Dot much food, so Edward arrives and throws them out. Edward leaves after taking Dot to the pub, and says he does not know when he will see her again. He visits Dot after buying flowers from Walford market to take to his wife's grave. They go to an over-60s film night at The Queen Victoria pub, and Edward tells Dot about his former lover, Betty, whom he met years ago and Dot tells him that she will help him find her on the internet. Dot contacts Betty via email and Betty then contacts Edward and they agree to meet. Dot hires a new carer, Marta Demboski (Magdalena Kurek) when Marta asks Edward why Dot is treating her badly, Edward sorts it out. Edward organises tea at the Ritz with Betty, but cancels so he can go with Dot. However, Dot has to cancel because Jim is returning home unexpectedly. Edward visits Dot again and invites her to watch a film at home. While they watch, Edward holds Dot's hand, but she pulls away. He admits that he likes her but she says she is married, so thanks Edward for the nice things he has done but tells him to leave and never return. The next day he calls her several times but she tells him to stop. He arrives on Albert Square to talk to Dot and she agrees to hear him out, but she ends up telling him again to leave her alone.

Development
In March 2011, June Brown discussed Dot and Edward's relationship in an interview with Digital Spy. She opined that the two characters have a lot in common, Edward enjoys Dot's company and would probably want a more romantic relationship but respects the fact she has a husband. Dot also enjoys spending time with Edward but is mortified when Carol Jackson (Lindsey Coulson) calls him her "fancy man" and is worried that other people will think they are more than friends. He was described by TV Scoop as "Dot's doting pal". An insider explained: "Carol doesn't really mean anything by it, but she makes a comment about Dot's relationship with Edward that really stings. Dot thinks Carol is implying there is something inappropriate about their friendship, and she’s outraged and humiliated." In May 2011, Brown said that Dot feels guilty about her relationship with Edward as "there is an attraction there, but because of her religious views she feels it is wrong."

Tommy Moon

Tommy Moon is the son of Kat Slater (Jessie Wallace) and Michael Moon (Steve John Shepherd). Tommy is initially played by two babies named Ralfie and Shane though in November 2013, Richie talked about Ralf (now aged three years) playing Tommy and made no mention of Shane. Shay Crotty took over the role from White in December 2015 and returned to it when Tommy returned in December 2018. In the Kat and Alfie series Redwater, which began airing from May 2017, he is played by Henry Proctor. On 25 November 2018, it was announced Tommy and his half-brothers, Bert and Ernie Moon, would be returning to EastEnders. In April 2021, the role was recast to Sonny Kendall, who made his on-screen debut as Tommy on 2 July 2021.

Tommy is born on-screen on 30 December 2010. In the following episode, Kat is taken to hospital and leaves her father Charlie Slater (Derek Martin) to look after Tommy. However, Charlie joins a party downstairs in The Queen Victoria public house. Meanwhile, Ronnie Branning (Samantha Womack) discovers that her son, James, who was born on the same day as Kat's, has died of sudden infant death syndrome and desperately tries to get help. When she hears Tommy crying, she sneaks into The Queen Vic and decides to swap the children. Ronnie eventually regrets her actions but by the time she decides to swap them back, James has been found by Alfie and Jack has returned to the country and meets Tommy, thinking he is James. When Kat sees the baby in the hospital, she refuses to believe it is Tommy as he looks different, but Alfie convinces her it is because he has died. When a midwife visits Ronnie, she is surprised at how quickly James' club foot appears to have gone. Ronnie is denied access to the funeral by Kat but goes anyway, hiding behind a tree. She later realises she has to put an end to the situation and takes Tommy back to Kat during the wake. Ronnie's attempts to explain that the baby is Tommy are all misunderstood and Kat demands that the baby be taken away from her.

Ronnie continues to care for Tommy but starts behaving erratically. She later returns to the hospital where she gave birth and meets her midwife, Diane McLean (Hannah Kew), and realises she has to give Tommy back to Kat immediately. She tells Jack that the baby is not his son, and then explains to Kat what happened on the night James died. Kat refuses to believe it but takes Tommy, while Ronnie hands herself in to the police. Jack says an emotional goodbye the next day as he hands Tommy over to social services. Alfie is interviewed by a social worker, but Kat leaves the hospital unable to cope. However, Jean Slater (Gillian Wright) tells Kat that it is a miracle that Tommy is alive, so Kat returns to the hospital to be interviewed, and they are reunited with Tommy. Although Kat struggles to bond with Tommy at first and refuses to say his name, she soon adjusts and she and Alfie have Tommy christened; his godparents are Jean and Ian Beale (Adam Woodyatt). However, Alfie and Kat end their marriage and they share custody of Tommy. Michael tells Tommy that he is his real father, angering Alfie, though Tommy is still too young to understand. Michael dies in November 2013 after being stabbed by Janine Butcher (Charlie Brooks), however, later that month Kat and Alfie reunite. In 2014, Kat gives birth to Tommy's twin brothers Bert and Ernie Moon (Freddie and Stanley Beale). Kat is badly burnt in a fire and after she becomes depressed, separating from Alfie, which affects Tommy negatively. Kat eventually reunites with Alfie. They win £1 million on a scratchcard and depart for a new life in Spain. Kat returns on Christmas Day to surprise her cousin, Stacey Branning (Lacey Turner), without Alfie and the children. Later, Alfie returns with Tommy, Bert and Ernie, annoyed that Kat has left them without warning.

Development
In September 2010, Shane Richie, who plays Kat's husband Alfie Moon, teased an upcoming storyline involving Alfie and Kat. Although he gave no details of the plot, he said that when he was offered the chance to return to the show to reprise his role as Alfie, he was informed of the storyline, which would be ongoing for "the best part of a year or maybe two years." He said it would be "the biggest soap story in probably the history of soaps," and that he and Wallace were excited to be involved. On 11 November 2010, details of the upcoming storyline were revealed by the BBC.

Executive producer Bryan Kirkwood said of the baby swap storyline: "This story built on the rich history both characters have built up over the years and the story team have worked hard to make this convincing and powerful. Although EastEnders is a fictional drama we have, of course, taken great care to thoroughly research this storyline, which will reflect  issue close to the hearts of some of our audience. We're fortunate to have two wonderful actresses, Jessie Wallace and Samantha Womack, who understand the need to portray such an emotive subject sensitively. Viewers will know that Ronnie has had a difficult past, losing both her daughter and father in the last couple of years. When she loses the one thing she's always wanted, she acts on impulse in a moment of sheer grief and desperation." Kirkwood later said the scenes would be believable and the storyline bold and gritty. He confirmed that a maternity nurse had been consulted on what would happen in real life, saying the crew made sure the two babies were born in different circumstances. The baby swap scenes are balanced with scenes of celebration elsewhere, to show "a community with a lot of love" in the hope it would "counter the inevitable darkness of this story."

It was reported on 24 December that several scenes had been edited prior to the broadcast. Shots of Ronnie touching James's cold hand were reportedly edited out and the sound of Tommy crying was toned down. A scene showing Kat in blood-soaked pyjamas after haemorrhaging was also edited. The baby's funeral was filmed on 25 November at  St James' Church in Bushey.

The scene where Ronnie swaps the children was called "powerful". Around 3,400 viewer complaints were received by the BBC, with viewers branding the storyline "insensitive", "irresponsible" and "desperate". Roz Laws from the Sunday Mercury called the plot "shocking and ridiculous" and asked "are we really supposed to believe that Kat won't recognise that the baby looks different?", although this comment was made prior to the episode where Kat didn't recognise 'her' baby. The Foundation for the Study of Infant Deaths (FSID) praised the storyline, and its director Joyce Epstein explained, "We are very grateful to EastEnders for their accurate depiction of the devastating effect that the sudden death of an infant can have on a family. We hope that this story will help raise the public's awareness of cot death, which claims 300 babies' lives each year." According to overnight figures, 10.6 million people watched 3 January 2011 episode, in which Kat claims the dead baby is not her son and Ronnie struggles to bond with Tommy.

In February 2011, the storyline was nominated in the Soap Bubble Awards under the name of 'baby swap', in the category 'Best Baby Drama'. In May, it was nominated for 'Best Storyline' at the 2011 British Soap Awards, under the title "Ronnie swaps her baby for Kat's".

In April 2021, actor Crotty announced that he would be leaving EastEnders via Instagram. He stated that it was an honour to work alongside Wallace and Richie, and thanked the producers of the soap for having him on the soap. Digital Spy confirmed that despite Crotty's departure, Tommy would continue to appear in the soap. In June 2021, it was announced Sonny Kendall would be taking over the role and his first scenes would air on 1 July 2021.

Others

Footnotes

References

External links

2010
, EastEnders
2010 in British television